Black Entertainment Television LLC, doing business as BET Networks, is an American entertainment company that oversees the company's premium cable television channels, including its flagship service BET. It is a subsidiary of media conglomerate Paramount Global under its CBS Entertainment Group unit.

History

Background 
In 1980, Robert L. Johnson, who left his position as a cable lobbyist; established his own cable network called Black Entertainment Television; and it was originally a block on the Madison Square Garden Sports Network (later renamed to USA Network), until it became a separate channel in 1983.

In 1991, the network became the first black–controlled TV company to be listed on the New York Stock Exchange.

Starting in the late 1990s, the network expanded with the launch of digital cable networks: BET on Jazz (later known as BET Jazz. BET J, Centric, and BET Her), created originally to showcase jazz music–related programming, especially that of black jazz musicians; in 1998, it entered into a joint venture with Starz(then–owned by John Malone's Liberty Media) to launch a multiplex service of the premium channel featuring African American–oriented movies called BET Movies: Starz! 3 (later renamed Black Starz after BET dropped out of the venture following its purchase by Viacom, then–owner of Starz rival Showtime, and now known as Starz InBlack).

Creation 
In 2000, Viacom announced plans to purchase BET Holdings Inc. for more than $2.3 billion. The deal closed in 2001, with BET Holdings' networks becoming part of MTV Networks; but was eventually placed under BET Networks.

In 2005, Robert Johnson retired as CEO, and was replaced with Debra L. Lee. Around the same time, Viacom was looking into splitting into two entities following multiple issues surrounding the company; which was eventually become upheld in January 2006, with the new Viacom being created as the new parent of MTV Networks, BET Networks, Paramount Pictures, and Famous Music (later sold to Sony Music in 2007); and CBS Corporation (the legal successor to the original Viacom), gaining CBS, Paramount Television, UPN, CBS Radio, and Paramount Parks (later sold to Cedar Fair in 2007).

By 2007, the network had launched two more music–oriented networks, BET Hip–Hop and BET Gospel. BET also launched a batch of original programming by this time, including reality shows Baldwin Hills and Hell Date, competition show Sunday Best, and town hall–style discussion show Hip Hop vs. America. BET's president of entertainment Reginald Hudlin resigned from the network on September 11, 2008. He was then replaced by Stephen Hill, who is also executive vice president of music programming and talent. BET announced in March 2010 that Ed Gordon would return to the network to host "a variety of news programs and specials".

In 2015, it gained editorial control of VH1 Soul & MTV Jams respectively, renaming it under the BET brand, while downplaying modern hip-hop music on BET Hip-Hop due to the control of MTV Jams, effectively becoming an archival Hip-Hop music channel.

In March 2017, president of programming Stephen Hill and executive vice president of original programming Zola Mashariki both stepped down. Connie Orlando, senior vice president of Specials, Music Programming, and News, was named the interim president of programming.

In July 2017, Viacom signed new film and television development deals with Tyler Perry following the expiration of his existing pact with Discovery, Inc. in 2019. As part of this deal, Perry would produce The Oval and Sistas for BET and co–own the network's newly launched streaming service, BET+.

After Viacom re-merged with CBS to form what is now Paramount Global, BET was transferred from the Paramount Media Networks division to CBS Entertainment Group under the oversight of the latter's president, George Cheeks.

Cable channels owned by BET Networks 
Year in parentheses denotes when channel was created.

 BET (1980)
 BET Her (1996)
 BET Gospel (2002)
 BET Hip-Hop (2002)
 BET Jams (2002) - formerly MTV Jams
 BET Soul (1998) - formerly known as VH1 Soul
 VH1 (1985)

Notes

References

External links 
 

 
American companies established in 1983
Television broadcasting companies of the United States
Cable network groups in the United States
Companies based in New York City
Mass media companies established in 1983
Paramount Media Networks
Paramount International Networks
2001 mergers and acquisitions